The Vivo Tennis Cup is a tennis tournament held in Rio de Janeiro, Brazil in 2016. The event is part of the ATP Challenger Tour and is played on outdoor clay courts.

Past finals

Singles

Doubles

References

External links 
 Official website

ATP Challenger Tour
Clay court tennis tournaments
Tennis tournaments in Brazil